College Corinthians A.F.C. is an Irish association football club based in Douglas, County Cork. Their senior men's team play in the Munster Senior League Senior Premier Division. They also regularly compete in the FAI Cup, the FAI Intermediate Cup and the Munster Senior Cup. Corinthians also fields a reserve team and an over 35 team in the lower divisions of the Munster Senior League. In addition the club operates a large youth and schoolboy section and enters teams in the Cork Schoolboys League and schoolgirl teams in the Cork Women's and Schoolgirls Soccer League.

History
College Corinthians was founded in 1971 by five former University College Cork A.F.C. players who were no longer eligible to play for the club after graduating from the university. Corinthians still maintain very strong links with UCC. It is not uncommon for players to play schoolboy football with Corinthians, then play youth football with UCC before returning to Corinthians to play senior football. Shortly after their founding, the club joined the Munster Senior League. In 1994 the club started its schoolboy section. Corinthians enjoyed one of their most successful seasons in 1994–95. The senior men's team won their first Munster Senior League Senior Premier Division title and also reached the FAI Intermediate Cup final. In addition their senior women's team reached the FAI Women's Cup final for the second time. In  1997–98, the senior men's team repeated the feat, winning their third Munster league title and reaching the FAI Intermediate Cup final for a second time.

Home grounds
Corinthians initially played their home games at UCC's The Farm. However, in 1990 the club set up its home base in Castletreasure, Donnybrook.

Notable former players
Republic of Ireland international
  David Meyler
  Adam Idah
Republic of Ireland U21 internationals
  Brian Lenihan
  Eoghan O'Connell
  Adam Idah
Republic of Ireland U23 international
  Graham Cummins
Republic of Ireland women's international
  Megan Connolly
Celebrities
  Ger Canning – RTÉ sports commentator

Honours
Senior Men's Team
Munster Senior League Senior Premier Division
Winners: 1994–95, 1996–97, 1997–98, 2000–01, 2002–03, 2019–20 : 6 
Runners-up: 1986–87, 2014–15: 2
Munster Senior League Senior First Division
Winners: 2010–11: 1 
Munster Senior Cup
Runners-up: 2000–01: 1
FAI Intermediate Cup
Runners-up: 1994–95, 1997–98: 2
Senior Women's Team
FAI Women's Cup
Runners-up: 1992–93, 1994–95, : 2
Women's Munster Senior Cup
Winners: 2014–15: 1

Schoolboys

2017- SFAI Under 15 Evans National Cup Winners

2018- SFAI Under 15 Evans National Cup Winners

References

 
Association football clubs in Cork (city)
Munster Senior League (association football) clubs
Association football clubs in County Cork
Women's association football clubs in the Republic of Ireland
Association football clubs established in 1971
1971 establishments in Ireland
Former Cork Athletic Union League clubs